Rossman's garter snake (Thamnophis rossmani) is a species of snake in the family Colubridae. The species is endemic to Mexico.

Etymology
The specific name rossmani is in honor of the American herpetologist Douglas A. Rossman.

Geographic range
T. rossmani is found in the Mexican state of Nayarit.

Habitat
The natural habitat of T. rossmani is freshwater wetlands.

Reproduction
T. rossmani is viviparous. A female was observed giving birth to four live young.

References

Further reading
Conant R (2000). "A new species of garter snake from Western Mexico". Occasional Papers of the Museum of Natural Science, Louisiana State University, Baton Rouge (76): 1–7. (Thamnophis rossmani, new species).
Heimes P (2016). Snakes of Mexico: Herpetofauna Mexicana Vol. I. Frankfurt, Germany: Chimaira. 572 pp. .
Wallach V, Williams KL, Boundy J (2014). Snakes of the World: A Catalogue of Living and Extinct Species. Boca Raton, Florida: CRC Press, Taylor & Francis Group. 1,237 pp. . (Thamnophis rossmani, p. 725).
Woolrich-Piña GA, Ponce-Campos P, Loc-Barragán J, Ramirez-Silva JP, Mata-Silva V, Johnson JD, García-Padilla E, Wilson LD (2016). "The herpetofauna of Nayarit, Mexico: composition, distribution, and conservation status". Mesoamerican Herpetology 3 (2): 375–448. (in English, with an abstract in Spanish).

Thamnophis
Reptiles described in 2000
Reptiles of Mexico
Taxa named by Roger Conant